Luddan, is a town located on the bank of the Sutlej in Vehari District, Punjab, Pakistan. Luddan is a rich agricultural area, with cotton, maize, rice, tobacco and sugarcane being major crops. Mumtaz Daultana, former Chief Minister of Punjab (1951-1953) was born here.

The main tribes of Luddan are Sukhera, Kharal, Arain, Lakhwera, Daultana, Joiyas, Sargana, Gazar, Taili, Khokhar, Tajwana, Tawana, Dhuddy, Machy, Sahbzaada, Meo, Channar, Bhatti, and Souroo.

Populated places in Vehari District